Courtauld is a surname. Notable people with the surname include:

Adam Courtauld Butler or Adam Butler (British politician), DL (1931–2008), British Conservative Party politician and MP
Augustine Courtauld (1904–1959), often called August Courtauld, was a yachtsman and British Arctic explorer
Courtauld Courtauld-Thomson, 1st Baron Courtauld-Thomson CB, KBE (1865–1954), British businessman and holder of public and charitable offices
George Courtauld (disambiguation), list of people with the name
John Sewell Courtauld (1880–1942), English Conservative Party politician
Louisa Courtauld (née Ogier) (1729–1807), English silversmith
Samuel Courtauld (art collector) (1876–1947), English industrialist best remembered as an art collector
Samuel Courtauld (industrialist) (1793–1881), industrialist and Unitarian, the driving force behind the growth of the Courtaulds textile business
Sir Stephen Courtauld, MC (1883–1967), member of the wealthy English Courtauld textile family
Sydney Courtauld JP (1840–1899), Crepe and Silk manufacturer, and part of the Courtauld family empire in Great Britain
William Julien Courtauld (1870–1940), 1st Baronet Courtauld of Penny Pot, and part of the Courtauld family empire in Great Britain

See also
The Courtauld Institute of Art
Mount Courtauld, a rounded, mainly ice-covered mountain on the west coast of Palmer Land
The Courtauld Talks, the eighth album by English post-punk group Killing Joke
Courtaulds

es:Courtauld